Hutchesons' GSFP RFC  was an amateur rugby union club in Glasgow, Scotland. The club no longer exists. In 1990, they merged with rivals Old Aloysians RFC to form Hutchesons Aloysians.

History
Hutchesons' GSFP was formed in 1923, by former pupils of the school's rugby side. They, too, played out of Auldhouse at Eastwood, south of Glasgow near Thornliebank; which was Hutchesons' Grammar School's sports ground.

The Former Pupil side was admitted as a full member of the Scottish Rugby Union in 1937. They remained a 'closed side' only open to former 'Hutchie' pupils until 1971, when they decided to widen their catchment and become an 'open side' admitting all suitable players. Hutchesons' GSFP entered the new National League set up in the 1973–74 at 2nd Division level.

Merger
It was noted at the end of season 1989-90 that Hutchesons and Old Aloysians were considering a merger. This was not without its detractors as The Glasgow Herald then noted: 'Some of the old boys of both Hutchie and Wally Dishes - as the Jesuit College in Garnethill was often less than affectionately known - are already convinced it is a bad idea.'

The SRU chief at the time, a former President of Hutchesons GSFP RFC, Jimmy McNeil, declared himself neutral on the merger. This was taken as tacit acceptance and the merger went through by 57 votes to 8 on Thursday 24 May 1990 at a Hutchesons GSFP EGM.

The Old Aloysians members had already approved the merger.

The new club Hutchesons Aloysians would take Hutchesons' GSFP's place in the league in Division 4 of the McEwan's National League for the coming 1990–91 season.

The Hutchesons' GSFP last games that season were at the Allan Glen's Sevens tournament in May 1990.

Sevens

The club ran a Sevens tournament once in 1926. This was to raise funds for their ground. The tournament was played at Glasgow Academical's New Anniesland ground.

Honours
 Renfrewshire Cup
 Champions: 1987–88, 1988-89
 Kilmarnock Sevens
 Champions: 1935, 1943, 1944, 1947
 Hyndland Sevens
 Champions: 1964
 Clarkston Sevens
 Champions: 1961
 Ayr Sevens
 Champions: 1951
 Greenock Sevens
 Champions: 1959

Notable former players

Scotland internationalist
The following former Hutchesons' GSFP player has represented Scotland at full international level.

Notable non-Scottish players
The following is a list of notable non-Scottish international representative former Hutchesons' GSFP players:

Glasgow District
The following former Hutchesons' GSFP players have represented Glasgow District at provincial level.

References

Rugby clubs established in 1923
Scottish rugby union teams
Rugby union in Glasgow
1923 establishments in Scotland
Defunct Scottish rugby union clubs
Sports clubs disestablished in 1990
1990 disestablishments in Scotland
Rugby union clubs disestablished in 1990